Springfield Township is one of thirteen townships in Franklin County, Indiana. As of the 2010 census, its population was 1,156.

History
Springfield Township was established in 1817. The origin of the name is unclear. Some hold it was named for a large spring where a blockhouse was to be built, while others believe it was named for a town in the East where the first settlers originated.

The Joseph Shafer Farm was listed on the National Register of Historic Places in 1982.

Geography

Cities and towns
 Mount Carmel

Unincorporated towns
 Palestine
 Peoria
 Raymond
 Scipio
(This list is based on USGS data and may include former settlements.)

Major highways
 Indiana State Road 252

Cemeteries
The township contains five cemeteries: Asbury, Big Cedar Grove, Conn, James, Mount Carmel and Springfield.

References
 United States Census Bureau cartographic boundary files
 U.S. Board on Geographic Names

External links
 Indiana Township Association
 United Township Association of Indiana

Townships in Franklin County, Indiana
Townships in Indiana